58 Andromedae, abbreviated 58 And, is a single star in the northern constellation Andromeda. 58 Andromedae is the Flamsteed designation.

This star is 425 million years old with a stellar classification of A5 IV-V, indicating the spectrum displays mixed traits of an A-type main-sequence star and an older subgiant star. It is spinning rapidly with a projected rotational velocity of 135 km/s, which is giving the star an oblate shape with an equatorial bulge that is 6% larger than the polar radius.  The star has double the mass of the Sun and about 1.9 times the Sun's radius. It is radiating 36 times the Sun's luminosity from its photosphere at an effective temperature of 8,875 K.

References

A-type subgiants
High-proper-motion stars
Andromeda (constellation)
Durchmusterung objects
Andromedae, 58
013041
009977
0620